Jan Malypetr (21 December 1873 in Klobuky – 27 September 1947 in Slaný) was a Czechoslovak politician. As prime minister during the Great Depression he strong-armed Czechoslovakia into a more rapid economic recovery than elsewhere in Europe.

A member of the Agrarian Party, he was the minister of Interior, and chairman of the Chamber of Deputies from 17 December 1925 to 29 October 1932 and again from 5 November 1935 to 1939.

Malypetr served three terms as prime minister of Czechoslovakia:
 29 October 1932 – 14 February 1934 
 14 February 1934 – 4 June 1935 
 4 June 1935 – 5 November 1935

Early life 
Jan Malypetr came from landed gentry in the German speaking part of Bohemia. After attending high school and business school in Kadaň, he worked on his parents' estate, which was called u Sakulínů. He also became the president of the local sugar beet cooperative refinery.

In 1899 Malypetr joined the Agrarian Party and in 1906 became a member of its Executive Committee. From 1911 to 1914 he was mayor in his home town of Klobuky. From 1914 to 1918 he was mayor in Slaný.

When Czechoslovakia became independent in 1918, Jan Malypetr was appointed to the first so-called Revolutionary National Assembly under the Provisional Constitution. In 1920, in the first parliamentary elections, he was elected to the Chamber of Deputies in the National Assembly.

Legacy
Among his grandsons was author Jiří Stránský.

See also 
 History of Czechoslovakia
 List of prime ministers of Czechoslovakia

References

External links
 Biography

1873 births
1947 deaths
People from Kladno District
People from the Kingdom of Bohemia
Republican Party of Farmers and Peasants politicians
Party of National Unity (Czechoslovakia) politicians
Prime Ministers of Czechoslovakia
Government ministers of Czechoslovakia
Members of the Revolutionary National Assembly of Czechoslovakia
Members of the Chamber of Deputies of Czechoslovakia (1920–1925)
Members of the Chamber of Deputies of Czechoslovakia (1925–1929)
Members of the Chamber of Deputies of Czechoslovakia (1929–1935)
Members of the Chamber of Deputies of Czechoslovakia (1935–1939)